Mamata Thakur (born 15 May 1967), is an Indian politician. She was elected to the Lok Sabha in a 2015 by-election, representing Bangaon for the All India Trinamool Congress. She came second in 2019 election, losing to BJP's candidate.

Career
From March 2015 she served as a member of the Standing Committee on Social Justice and Empowerment; the term ended when that Lok Sabha was dissolved in 2019. She is a Matua Maha religious mother of the Matua Mahasangha community. She lives in the town of Thakurnagar.

References 

Living people
1967 births
Trinamool Congress politicians from West Bengal
People from Chandrapur
Social workers
Lok Sabha members from West Bengal
India MPs 2014–2019
Women in West Bengal politics
21st-century Indian women politicians
21st-century Indian politicians
People from North 24 Parganas district
Social workers from West Bengal
Women educators from West Bengal
Educators from West Bengal
Matua people